Broadway Bad is a 1933 American Pre-Code drama film directed by Sidney Lanfield and written by Maude Fulton. The film stars Joan Blondell, Ricardo Cortez, Ginger Rogers, Adrienne Ames, and Francis McDonald. The film was released on February 24, 1933, by Fox Film Corporation.

Plot
Married chorus girl rides scandal to stardom.

Cast       
Joan Blondell as Tony Landers
Ricardo Cortez as Craig Cutting
Ginger Rogers as Flip Daly
Adrienne Ames as Aileen
Allen Vincent as Bob North
Francis McDonald as Charley Davis
Frederick Burton as Robert North, Sr
Donald Crisp as Darrall

References

External links
 

1933 films
Fox Film films
American drama films
1933 drama films
Films directed by Sidney Lanfield
American black-and-white films
Films scored by Hugo Friedhofer
Films scored by Arthur Lange
1930s English-language films
1930s American films